Darius Msagha Mbela was a Kenyan politician. He was a minister for agriculture and a former member of parliament for the Wundanyi Constituency.

References

Year of birth missing (living people)
Living people
Members of the National Assembly (Kenya)
Ministers of Agriculture of Kenya
Place of birth missing (living people)